Sir Richard Threlfall (14 August 1861 – 10 July 1932) was an English chemist and engineer, he established the School of Physics at the University of Sydney and made important contributions to military science during World War I. He was elected a fellow of the Royal Society in 1899, and was created KBE in 1917 and GBE in 1927.

Early life and education
Threlfall was a son of Richard Threlfall of Hollowforth, near Preston, Lancashire. He was educated at Clifton College, where he was captain of the Rugby XV, and shot in the Rifle VIII. Going on to Gonville and Caius College, Cambridge, he represented his University at Rugby and also at rifle shooting. He distinguished himself as a speaker at the union, and did a remarkable course, taking a first class in the first part of the natural science tripos, and a first in both physics and chemistry in the second part.

He married Evelyn Agnes, daughter of John Forster-Baird, one of four sisters who all married distinguished men, one of whom was Bernhard Wise.

Science career
After graduating he was appointed a demonstrator in the Cavendish laboratory, where he did successful original research work and showed himself to be an able teacher. He also studied at Strasburg University and for a short period was a successful university coach. He lost two-thirds of his fingers in an explosion while he was carrying nitroglycerine, but in spite of this continued to be an excellent manipulator.

Professorship
In 1886 Threlfall was appointed professor of physics at the University of Sydney and founded the school. He had no building and little apparatus when he began his work, but in 1888 a physical laboratory was completed and the necessary appliances were purchased. He carried out his duties with energy and also found time for research. An early invention was the rocking microtome, an instrument which proved to be of great value in biological study. Another was a quartz thread balance which enabled him to obtain great accuracy in his comparison of values for gravity at different places. In 1896 he was president of a royal commission on the carriage of coal in ships. He obtained leave of absence in 1898 to inquire into methods of teaching electrical subjects in Europe, but on his return resigned his chair as from 31 December 1898, as circumstances had made it necessary that he should live in England.

Consulting engineer
Threlfall now became a consulting engineer and established a high reputation as an electro-chemist, combining chemical insight with the aptitude of an engineer. He joined the firm of Albright and Wilson, large producers of phosphorus, at Oldbury, and continued his connection until the time of his death. His experience in this direction was to prove of the greatest service to his country during the 1914–18 war, particularly in connexion with smoke screens and tracer bullets. In 1915 he was on the Board of Invention and Research, in 1916 he joined the advisory council for scientific and industrial research and also the munitions inventions board. In 1917 he became a member of the chemical warfare committee, and in 1918 he joined the food preservation board. An organization which carried on its work after the war, the fuel research board was joined by him in 1917 and he became its chairman in 1923.

Though his main work was in industrial chemistry he kept up his interest in pure science, and was a frequent attendant at meetings of the Royal Society of London.

Death
Threlfall died on 10 July 1932 and is buried in a family tomb at St Anne's Church, Woodplumpton, Lancashire. He was survived by four sons and two daughters. He was the author of On Laboratory Arts, published in 1898, and of papers in scientific journals.

References

External links
 
 

1861 births
1932 deaths
British chemists
Fellows of the Royal Society
Knights Grand Cross of the Order of the British Empire
Academic staff of the University of Sydney
Alumni of Gonville and Caius College, Cambridge
People educated at Clifton College
English emigrants to Australia
X-ray pioneers
Australian physicists